Caenurgina annexa, the banded grass moth, is a moth of the family Erebidae. The species was described by Henry Edwards in 1890. It is found in western North America from western Alberta and Montana to British Columbia, Washington, and Oregon.

The wingspan is 28–30 mm. Adults are on wing from May to June depending on the location.

References

External links

Moths of North America
Moths described in 1890
Caenurgina